Steven Mansbach (born 1950) is an American historian, currently a Distinguished University Professor in History of 20th-century art at University of Maryland. He is also the Founding Dean and Director of the American Academy in Berlin.

References

External links
UMD page

21st-century American historians
21st-century American male writers
University of Maryland, College Park faculty
Cornell University alumni
1950 births
Living people
American male non-fiction writers